Laze pri Domžalah is a small settlement east of Domžale in the Upper Carniola region of Slovenia.

Name
The name of the settlement was changed from Laze to Laze pri Domžalah in 1955.

References

External links

Laze pri Domžalah on Geopedia

Populated places in the Municipality of Domžale